Amelia may refer to:

Arts, entertainment, and media

Films
 Amélia (film), a 2000 Brazilian film directed by Ana Carolina
 Amelia (film), a 2009 film based on the life of Amelia Earhart

Literature
 Amelia (magazine), a Swedish women's magazine
 Amelia (novel), a 1751 sentimental novel by Henry Fielding
 Amelia Bedelia, a series of US children's books
 Amelia Jane, a series of books by Enid Blyton
 Amelia Rules!, a series of American children's graphic novels

Music
 Amelia (opera), music by Daron Hagen; libretto by Gardner McFall; story by Stephen Wadsworth
 "Amelia" (song), a song by Joni Mitchell on her 1976 album Hejira
 "Amelia", a song by The Mission, from the album Carved in Sand
 "Amelia", a song by the Cocteau Twins on their 1984 album Treasure
 "Amelia", a song by Prism on their 1977 album Prism
 "Amelia", a 1972 song by Wayne Cochran and The C.C. Riders

People
 Amelia (given name), including people so named

 Marco Amelia (born 1982), Italian football goalkeeper
 Princess Amelia (disambiguation)

Places

United States
 Amelia, Louisiana, a census-designated place in St. Mary Parish, Louisiana
 Amelia, Nebraska, an unincorporated community in Holt County, Nebraska
 Amelia, Ohio, a village in Clermont County, Ohio
 Amelia, Washington
 Amelia, West Virginia
 Amelia City, Florida, a town in Nassau County, Florida
 Amelia County, Virginia
 Amelia Courthouse, Virginia, a village in Amelia County near Richmond
 Amelia Island, the southernmost of the Sea Islands, near Florida

Elsewhere
 Amelia, Umbria, a town in Italy
 Amelia Cove, a former settlement in Newfoundland and Labrador, Canada

Ships
 Amelia (ship) 
 HMS Amelia, ships of the Royal Navy

Other uses
 Amelia (birth defect)
 Amelia (typeface)
 Tropical Storm Amelia (disambiguation)
Amelia (company), an internet technology company

See also
 Aemilia (disambiguation)
 Amélie (disambiguation)